Ahmed Mohamed Al-Merjabi (born 9 September 1990 in Ibra, Oman) is an Omani runner. He was scheduled to compete at the 2012 Summer Olympics in the 400 m event but injured his foot in training and did not start the race.

International competitions

1Disqualified in the final

References

External links
 

Omani male sprinters
Living people
1990 births
Omani male hurdlers
Athletes (track and field) at the 2014 Asian Games
Asian Games competitors for Oman
People from Ash Sharqiyah North Governorate